Bürvənd (also, Burvənd, Burvend, and Burvit) is a village in the Hajigabul Rayon of Azerbaijan.  The village forms part of the municipality of Ələtli.

References 

Populated places in Hajigabul District